No More Tears is an album by Ozzy Osbourne.

No More Tears may also refer to:

Music

Albums
 No More Tears (For Lady Day), a 1988 album by Mal Waldron
 No More Tears (EP), by Black Label Society

Songs
 "No More Tears" (Angela Winbush song)
 "No More Tears" (Anita Baker song)
 "No More Tears" (Jeanette song)
 "No More Tears" (Modjo song)
 "No More Tears" (Ozzy Osbourne song), the title song from the Ozzy Osbourne album
 "No More Tears (Enough Is Enough)", a song by Barbra Streisand and Donna Summer
 "No More Tears", by Andrew Jackson Jihad from the album People That Can Eat People Are the Luckiest People in the World
 "No More Tears", by Little River Band from the album The Net
 "No More Tears", by Namie Amuro from the single "Think of Me" / "No More Tears"

Other uses
 "No More Tears", a trademark for Johnson's baby shampoo

See also
 No More Tears Sister, a 2005 documentary film
 "Enough Is Enough (No More Tears)", an episode of the TV series Grey's Anatomy